Pramod Karan Sethi (28 November 1927 – 6 January 2008) was an Indian orthopaedic surgeon. With Ram Chandra Sharma, he co-invented the  "Jaipur foot", an inexpensive and flexible artificial limb, in 1969.

He was awarded the Magsaysay Award for Community Leadership in 1981 and the Padma Shri by the Government of India in 1981.

Personal life and career 
Sethi was born at Varanasi (then Banaras), where his father Nihal Karan Sethi, himself a renowned scientist, was a physics professor at Banaras Hindu University. Sethi trained as a general surgeon at Agra under G. N. Vyas. In 1958, he specialised in orthopaedics, when the Sawai Man Singh Hospital in Jaipur where he worked needed an orthopaedics department because of a Medical Council of India inspection. He later cited his lack of qualifications in orthopaedics as an advantage in developing the Jaipur foot. Much of his practice was in physiotherapy, including the rehabilitation of amputees. He retired in 1981. He was the founder of MVSS.

He was married to Sulochana, and the couple had a son and three daughters. Sethi died of cardiac arrest in Jaipur, India.

Jaipur foot 
The Jaipur foot is made of rubber and wood and is probably the lowest cost prosthetic limb available in the world. The International Red Cross Committee has used it extensively in Afghanistan and other places to help amputees. Several injured soldiers in the Kargil war were benefited due to the Jaipur foot. Sethi was recognized by the Guinness Book of World Records for helping a large number of amputees in obtaining mobility again. The Indian dancer and actor Sudha Chandran was one of his patients.

Ram Chandra Sharma, an illiterate craftsman, is the co-inventor of the foot. The original idea of the Jaipur foot is supposed to have come to him serendipitously while he was riding a bicycle and had a flat tire.

Awards 
Sethi was awarded the Magsaysay Award for Community Leadership in 1981, the Padma Shri by the Government of India in 1981   and he also won a major Rotary International award. He was elected a fellow of the British Royal College of Surgeons.

References

External links 

 Time Magazine article on PK Sethi and Jaipur Foot
 The 1981 Ramon Magsaysay Award for Community Leadership: Biography of Pramod Karan Sethi
 New York Times: P. K. Sethi, Inventor of the Low-Tech Limb, Is Dead at 80 
 News item about Dr. Sethi's death

1927 births
2008 deaths
Rajasthani people
Scientists from Varanasi
Ramon Magsaysay Award winners
Recipients of the Padma Shri in medicine
Fellows of the Royal College of Surgeons
Indian orthopedic surgeons
20th-century Indian medical doctors
Medical doctors from Uttar Pradesh
20th-century surgeons
People from Varanasi